Three vessels of the British Royal Navy have borne the name Sophie:

  was a French merchantman of 802 tons (bm) that  captured in 1782. The Royal Navy took her into service as a sixth rate, but then sold her in 1784.
 HMS Sophie (1798) was the French slaver Sophie launched in 1790 that became a privateer and that the French Navy requisitioned in 1794.  captured her in 1798. The Royal Navy took her into service. It broke her up in 1809.
  was a  launched in 1809. The Royal Navy sold her in the Far East in 1825.

See also 
 

Royal Navy ship names